Lepidochrysops caerulea is a butterfly in the family Lycaenidae. It is found on Madagascar.

References

Butterflies described in 1961
Lepidochrysops
Endemic fauna of Madagascar
Butterflies of Africa